Johann Sebastian Bach composed the church cantata  (Why would you grieve), 107 in Leipzig for the seventh Sunday after Trinity and first performed on 23 July 1724. The chorale cantata is based on the words of Johann Heermann's hymn in seven stanzas "" (1630).

Bach structured the cantata, the seventh work in his chorale cantata cycle, in seven movements: two framing choral movements, a recitative and an unusual sequence of four bipartite arias. He scored the work for three vocal soloists, a four-part choir, and a Baroque chamber ensemble of a horn to reinforce the hymn tune in the outer movements, two transverse flutes, two oboes d'amore, strings and continuo. It is the only known work from his chorale cantata cycle that kept the original words unchanged.

History and words 
Bach composed the chorale cantata in Leipzig for the Seventh Sunday after Trinity. The prescribed readings for the Sunday are from the Epistle to the Romans, "I speak in human terms because of your human limitations ... the wages of sin is death; but the gift of God is eternal life", and from the Gospel of Mark, the feeding of the 4000.

The cantata is based on Johann Heermann's hymn in seven stanzas, "" (1630), which is focused on trust in God, even when facing adversaries including the devil. Trust in God is also a theme of the Gospel. Unusually for a chorale cantata of the second cycle, the text is not changed in the middle movements, but kept "" (for all stanzas). The middle movements are, however, composed as a recitative and four arias. The treatment was decidedly old-fashioned in Bach's time. John Eliot Gardiner assumes that Bach imposed this restriction on himself, as he had done with the restriction to place the cantus firmus in soprano, alto, tenor and bass in the first four cantatas of the cycle. Gardiner comments on the "seventeenth-century design" of composing the unchanged chorale text, compared to settings of Stölzel, Telemann and Graupner:

The chorales in Heermann's 1630 publication  (Music of a devoted heart), which also included "", the first chorale in Bach's St Matthew Passion, have been described as "the first in which the correct and elegant versification of Opitz was applied to religious subjects, … distinguished by great depth and tenderness of feeling, by an intense love of the Saviour, and earnest but not self-conscious humility".

Bach first performed the cantata, the seventh extant cantata of his second annual cycle, on 23 July 1724.

Music

Scoring and structure 
Bach structured the cantata in seven movements, beginning with a chorale fantasia and ending in a closing chorale, as usually in his chorale cantatas, but with an unusual sequence of only one recitative and four arias, setting the poetic hymn stanzas. He scored it for three vocal soloists (soprano (S), tenor (T) and bass) (B), a four-part choir, and a Baroque chamber ensemble of corno da caccia (Co) to support the chorale tune in the outer movements, two flauti traversi (Ft), two oboes d'amore (Oa), two violins (Vl), two violas (Va) and basso continuo (Bc).

In the following table of the movements, the scoring follows the Neue Bach-Ausgabe, the keys are given for the Weimar version. The time signature is provided using the symbol for common time (4/4).

Movements

1 
The opening chorus, "" (Why do you wish to trouble yourself), is a chorale fantasia, with the vocal part embedded in an independent concerto of the instruments. The cantus firmus on the melody of "" is in long notes, partly embellished, in the soprano and horn; the lower voices are mostly set in homophony. The lines of the chorale are not rendered separately, but accenting the bar form (Stollen–Stollen–Abgesang) of the text, 1 and 2 are combined, 3 and 4 are combined, 5 is single and 6 to 8 are combined. The scoring is relatively rich in woodwinds.

2 
The following four stanzas are composed as arias, not as the typical da capo arias, but mostly in two parts. Bach achieves variation by changing voice type, key and time signature. He also varies the mode, alternating major and minor keys, expresses different affekts, and he successfully "blurs" the bar form of the stanzas.

3 
The first aria, "" (In Him you can dare all), depicts a "hunting scene" for bass and strings. Bach plays on the double meaning of the German word , which in the text has the sense "achieve by great exertion", but he expresses the word's literal meaning ("to hunt") by an "outrageous hunting call trill" of the bass. This aria and those following are not da capo arias, but follow the bar form of the poem as bipartite structures.

4 
The second aria, "" (Even if, out of hell), for tenor and continuo begins with strong words on Satan as an enemy: "" ("Even if, out of hell, Satan wishes to set himself against you, and vent his rage on you"). Gardiner calls the music "a vivid pen-portrait of Satan and his wiles, delivered with typically Lutheran relish". The rhythm alternates between 6/8 and 3/4 one measure to the next, but the change is irregular and unpredictable. The bass line (marked "") is "extravagantly animated and angular. Albert Schweitzer likens it to the contortions of a huge dragon".

5 
The third aria, "" (He arranges for your honor), for soprano and the two oboes d'amore begins with an embellished version of the chorale tune, and the last line quotes the tune exactly on the words "" ("What God wants, that happens").

6 
The fourth aria, "" (Therefore, I devote myself to Him), is scored for tenor, the flutes in unison and muted violin. The melodic style is significantly different from the chorale melody, being song-like.

7 
The closing chorale, "" (Lord, grant that Your honor), is set in four parts for the voices, but embedded in a rich orchestral Siciliano concerto. The lines of the chorale are grouped as in the first stanza, again highlighting line 5, "" ("Oh Father, Son and Spirit") as a miniature doxology.

Recordings 

The table entries are excerpted from the list of recordings from the selection on the Bach Cantatas Website. Ensemble playing period instruments in historically informed performances are marked by green background.

References

Sources 
 
 Was willst du dich betrüben BWV 107; BC A 109 / Chorale cantata (7th Sunday after Trinity) Bach Digital
 BWV 107 Was willst du dich betrüben English translation, University of Vermont
 Luke Dahn: BWV 107.7 bach-chorales.com

Church cantatas by Johann Sebastian Bach
1724 compositions
Chorale cantatas